The carrot cake is a cocktail that is said to taste like carrot cake, although it does not contain any carrot cake ingredients.  It is a shooter drink composed of one third Bailey's Irish Cream, one third Hot Damn Cinnamon Schnapps and one third Frangelico. Alternate Recipe: 1/3 Bailey's Irish Cream, 1/3 Butterscotch Schnapps, and 1/3 Goldschlager.

See also
 List of cocktails
 

Cocktails with liqueur
Shooters (drinks)
Three-ingredient cocktails
Cocktails with Irish cream